Miloderes is a genus of broad-nosed weevils in the beetle family Curculionidae. There are about nine described species in Miloderes.

Species
These nine species belong to the genus Miloderes:
 Miloderes allredi Tanner, 1974 i b
 Miloderes amargosensis Van Dam & O?Brien, 2015 c g
 Miloderes mercuryensis Tanner, 1966 i c g
 Miloderes nelsoni Kissinger, 1960 i c g
 Miloderes panamintensis Van Dam & O?Brien, 2015 c g
 Miloderes setosus Casey, 1888 i c g
 Miloderes tingi Tanner, 1974 i c g
 Miloderes ubehebensis Van Dam & O?Brien, 2015 c g
 Miloderes viridis Pierce, 1909 i c g
Data sources: i = ITIS, c = Catalogue of Life, g = GBIF, b = Bugguide.net

References

Further reading

 
 
 
 

Entiminae
Articles created by Qbugbot